The SMW Heavyweight Championship was the top heavyweight championship in Smoky Mountain Wrestling. It existed from 1992 until 1995 when SMW folded. "Dirty White Boy" Tony Anthony and Brad Armstrong were tied at the most reigns at three. The United States Wrestling Association briefly recognized the SMW Heavyweight Championship as part of a USWA vs. SMW feud in late 1995, before abandoning the title.

Title history

See also
Smoky Mountain Wrestling
United States Wrestling Association

References

Smoky Mountain Wrestling championships
Heavyweight wrestling championships